Kyösti Kallio (10 April 1873 – 19 December 1940) was a Finnish politician who served as the fourth president of Finland from 1937 to 1940; his presidency included leading the country through the Winter War. After the war, he became both the first President of Finland to resign and the only one to die in office, dying of a heart attack while returning home after submitting his resignation, before the official end of his term.

Kallio was the only president of Finland who did not have an academic or similar degree. He was a prominent leader of the Agrarian League party, and served as Prime Minister four times and Speaker of the Parliament six times. During his political career, he also served as a five-time Minister of Agriculture for most of the period between 1917 and 1922, including in the Independence Senate and the Civil War-era White cabinet, led a 1922 land reform to aid tenant farmers in acquiring their own land, and was a candidate in the 1931 presidential election before defeating incumbent president Pehr Evind Svinhufvud in the subsequent elections of 1937.

Biography

Early life
Kyösti Kallio, originally Gustaf Kalliokangas (forename's , surname's ), was born in Ylivieska, Grand Duchy of Finland, which was an autonomous region of the Russian Empire at the time. His father Mikko Kalliokangas was a farmer and prominent local politician. Kyösti Kallio was educated in Oulu where he became acquainted with Santeri Alkio, author and future ideologue of the Agrarian League.

Start of career
Kallio entered politics during the first Russification campaign of Finland as a member of the Young Finnish Party. He served in the Diet of Finland from 1904 to 1906 as a member of the Estate of the Peasantry. He joined the newly founded Agrarian League in 1906 and became one of its most prominent leaders.

Finland gains independence
After the February Revolution of 1917 dethroned Tsar Nicholas II, the Russian provisional government tasked Vice Admiral Adrian Nepenin with overseeing the change of government in Finland. Nepenin started by inviting a handful of Finnish politicians to discuss the situation on March 17. Kallio represented the Agrarian League; and when the Finnish politicians the next day sent a delegation to Saint Petersburg to negotiate a cessation to the Russification campaign, Kallio was again a member. The delegation was successful, and Finland was permitted to assemble a fully parliamentary Senate. Kallio came to serve as Agrarian minister in the Senate of Oskari Tokoi, which took office March 26. Most of his time was spent trying to mediate the agrarian strikes and finding foodstuffs for the country, while the First World War raised the prices in Europe.

After the Tsar had been dethroned, the Finnish Parliament had to decide whether the highest authority in the country had passed on to the Russian Provisional Government, the Finnish Parliament, or the Finnish Senate. The question led to serious strife between the right-wing and left-wing elements of the Parliament. Kallio initially supported the socialists in demanding that power transfer to the Parliament, but disapproved of their cooperation with Russian Bolsheviks and Mensheviks; and Kallio ultimately voted against the bill they had drafted. Nonetheless, the socialist proposal passed, which the Russian Provisional Government saw as an affront to their power; and Alexander Kerensky consequently dissolved the Finnish Parliament on September 8. Kallio and the Socialist senators resigned from the senate, which continued to operate under the leadership of E. N. Setälä.

After the October Revolution, the Finnish bourgeoisie were willing to compromise and give parliament the highest authority fearing Bolshevik rule would spread to Finland. Setälä's Senate resigned immediately after the question was settled. Kallio was again named Agrarian Minister in the Senate of P. E. Svinhufvud whose first priority was to declare Finland independent. On December 4 the Senate introduced a declaration of independence to the Parliament; and the next day Kallio wrote a resolution, which the Parliament passed with votes 100–88.

Civil war
During the Civil War in Finland, Kallio hid in red-dominated Helsinki, because he was at least nominally on the white side and therefore a "class enemy"; he formed a new senate (government) in Helsinki after German troops had defeated the reds in the city. Afterwards he became a moderate peace-maker and disapproved of retaliation against the reds.

Formation of the republic
During the debates over the form of the new state in 1918, Kallio resigned from the senate because he supported a republic instead of constitutional monarchy. Eventually, the monarchist stand lost, and he returned to the Cabinet to become prime minister. He was a reformist who emphasized education, settlement, and land reform. His greatest achievement was "Lex Kallio" in 1922, legislation allowing the state to buy land to encourage new settlements, and to let the former tenant farmers and other landless rural people buy small farms (see, for example, Seppo Zetterberg et al., ed., "Suomen historian pikkujättiläinen").

Supported prohibition
He supported Prohibition in Finland, and was dismayed when it was repealed in 1932.

Non-violent anti-communist
Kallio was an anti-communist, suppressing the Finnish Communist Party (SKP) in 1923, but he resorted to legislative methods. When the violent right-wing Lapua Movement asked him to become their leader, he refused and was then instead subjected to their death threats.

President
Kallio was elected president with the votes of a centrist (Agrarian and Progressive) and social democratic coalition, which wanted to ensure that President Svinhufvud would not be re-elected. Kallio took the role of a parliamentarian president and avoided use of his personal power.

On the eve of the Winter War, when Marshal Mannerheim once again threatened to resign from his post as chairman of Finland's Defence Council due to a schism with the cabinet, Kallio convinced him to stay. During the war Kallio resisted the idea of giving up any territory to the Soviet Union, but was forced to agree to sign the Moscow Peace Treaty in 1940. His health began to fail – and his right arm was paralyzed – He was not active in the dealings with Germany leading to the Continuation War. On 27 August Kallio suffered a serious stroke. Prime Minister Risto Ryti took over his duties. Kallio's heart became weak while he knowingly took risks by agreeing to the formal farewell ceremonies.

Resignation and death

Kallio left a notice of resignation on 27 November 1940. He was planning to leave the capital and retire to his farm at Nivala after the farewell ceremonies on the evening of 19 December 1940; but he collapsed and died that night at the Helsinki Central Railway Station in the arms of his adjutant before a guard of honour while a band played the patriotic Finnish march Porilaisten marssi. One story tells that Kallio died in the arms of Marshal Mannerheim, but this is most likely part of the construction of Mannerheim's personal cult. In reality, Kallio died in the arms of his adjutant Aladár Paasonen and colonel A. F. Airo.

Religious views

A significant part of Kallio's personality and a motive for the social reforms which he supported and promoted was his deep Christian faith, which he had adopted already at home, and which was deepened during his marriage to Kaisa Nivala, who was also a devout Christian. Although Kallio was often too busy to go to church, he prayed often when encountering difficulties in making political decisions, and some of these prayers he recorded in his diary. He also read Christian books with his wife and often discussed them by exchanging letters. He often referred to God in his speeches, and during the Winter War he asked the Finns who were serving their country to read the Bible. When he was forced to sign the harsh Moscow Peace Treaty in March 1940, Kallio quoted freely from the Book of Zechariah, saying:  His right arm was paralysed the following summer, and he was forced to switch his writing hand. In the Presidential Palace, shortly before leaving for Helsinki Central Railway Station for the last time, Kallio sang a hymn with his family.

In popular culture
Kallio was played by Ossi Ahlapuro in the 2001 television film Valtapeliä elokuussa 1940, directed by Veli-Matti Saikkonen.

Gallery

Cabinets
 Kallio I Cabinet
 Kallio II Cabinet
 Kallio III Cabinet
 Kallio IV Cabinet

Honours

Awards and decorations
  Grand Cross of the Order of the White Rose (Finland)
  Grand Cross of the Order of the Cross of Liberty
  Knight of the Order of the Seraphim (Sweden)
  Order of the Polar Star (Sweden)
  Order of Falcon (Iceland)
  Collar of the Order of the White Star
  Cross of Liberty Military Leadership (Estonia)
  Cross of Liberty Civilian Service (Estonia)
  Order of the Cross of the Eagle
  Order of the Estonian Red Cross
  Order of Three Stars (Latvia)
  Order of Merit (Hungary)
  Order of Polonia Restituta

References

External links
 
 Kyösti Kallio in The Presidents of Finland

1873 births
1940 deaths
People from Ylivieska
People from Oulu Province (Grand Duchy of Finland)
Finnish Lutherans
Centre Party (Finland) politicians
Presidents of Finland
Prime Ministers of Finland
Finnish senators
Ministers of Agriculture of Finland
Ministers of Defence of Finland
Ministers of Transport and Public Works of Finland
Members of the Diet of Finland
Speakers of the Parliament of Finland
Members of the Parliament of Finland (1907–08)
Members of the Parliament of Finland (1908–09)
Members of the Parliament of Finland (1909–10)
Members of the Parliament of Finland (1910–11)
Members of the Parliament of Finland (1911–13)
Members of the Parliament of Finland (1913–16)
Members of the Parliament of Finland (1916–17)
Members of the Parliament of Finland (1917–19)
Members of the Parliament of Finland (1919–22)
Members of the Parliament of Finland (1922–24)
Members of the Parliament of Finland (1924–27)
Members of the Parliament of Finland (1927–29)
Members of the Parliament of Finland (1929–30)
Members of the Parliament of Finland (1930–33)
Members of the Parliament of Finland (1933–36)
Members of the Parliament of Finland (1936–39)
People of the Finnish Civil War (White side)
Finnish anti-communists
Recipients of the Order of the Falcon
World War II political leaders